Melanoplus punctulatus, known generally as the pine tree spur-throat grasshopper or grizzly spur-throat grasshopper, is a species of spur-throated grasshopper in the family Acrididae. It is found in North America.

Subspecies
These three subspecies belong to the species Melanoplus punctulatus:
 Melanoplus punctulatus arboreus Scudder, 1897 i c g
 Melanoplus punctulatus griseus (Thomas, 1872) i c g
 Melanoplus punctulatus punctulatus (Scudder, 1863) i c g
Data sources: i = ITIS, c = Catalogue of Life, g = GBIF, b = Bugguide.net

References

External links

 

Melanoplinae
Articles created by Qbugbot
Insects described in 1863
Orthoptera of North America